C.I.Agent Solutions is a Louisville, Kentucky-based company that specializes in environmental protection services. The company develops products to clean up hydrocarbon (fuel and oil) spills on land and water. Their main product is called C.I.Agent, a proprietary blend of USDA food-grade polymers that solidifies hydrocarbons.

History
C.I.Agent Solutions was founded in 2000 by Dan Parker. He has served as president and a member of the board of directors since its inception.
According to Dan Parker, the company was initially founded to effectively assist businesses to minimize their hazardous waste, reduce their legal liabilities, increase employee productivity and save money at the same time.

Deepwater Horizon oil spill
C.I.Agent Solutions was approached by BP (at request of the Alabama Department of Emergency Management) to aid in shoreline protection efforts during the Deepwater Horizon oil spill. On Dauphin Island, the Alabama National Guard built a five-mile (eight-kilometer) barricade filled with C.I.Agent that officials called "the longest oil-water separator in the world".

United States Senate Committee hearing
C.I.Agent Solutions founder Dan Parker and business partner Dan Koons appeared before the U.S. Senate Committee on Small Business & Entrepreneurship in Washington on June 17, 2010. The hearing, dubbed Harnessing Small Business Innovation: Navigating the Evaluation Process for Gulf Coast Oil Cleanup Proposals, focused on small businesses obtaining contracts from the federal government to support clean up of the Gulf Coast oil spill. Dan Parker and Dan Koons were invited to explain the efforts C.I.Agent Solutions has had to go through to get attention to innovative oil spill cleanup technologies.

See also
 Oil Spill
 Deepwater Horizon Oil Spill
 Hydrocarbon
 Polymers
 Hazardous waste
 BP
 Environmental Protection Agency
 Secondary spill containment
 Boom (containment)
 National Oil and Hazardous Substances Pollution Contingency Plan

References and notes

Companies based in Louisville, Kentucky
Specialty chemical companies
Waste management companies of the United States
Environmental protection
American companies established in 2000
2000 establishments in Kentucky